"Something to Do with My Hands" is  a song recorded by American country music singer Thomas Rhett. It was released in February 2012 as the first single from his debut album, It Goes Like This. Rhett wrote the song with Lee Thomas Miller and Chris Stapleton.

Critical reception
Billy Dukes of Taste of Country gave the song three and a half stars out of five, calling it "clever, but not so cheeky that the joke tires after a listen or three." Kyle Ward of Roughstock gave the song three stars out of five, writing that "it sounds great sonically and the catchy beat and melody mostly make up for a fairly clunky hook that only sort of works." The song received a C grade from Kevin John Coyne of Country Universe, who wrote that "what could’ve been cute and goofy in a sellin’ turnips on a flatbed truck way, ends up just sounding dumb and ridiculous."

Music videos
Two music videos were produced for the song. The first, directed by Justin Key, premiered in February 2012. A second music video directed by Peter Zavadil premiered in April 2012.

Chart performance
"Something to Do with My Hands" debuted at number 58 on the U.S. Billboard Hot Country Songs chart for the week of February 18, 2012.

Year-end charts

References

2012 debut singles
2012 songs
Thomas Rhett songs
Big Machine Records singles
Songs written by Lee Thomas Miller
Songs written by Chris Stapleton
Music videos directed by Peter Zavadil
Song recordings produced by Jay Joyce
Songs written by Thomas Rhett